OISM can refer to the following:

Oregon Institute of Science and Medicine
Orthodox Inter-Seminary Movement